Jafarabad (also Romanized as Ja‘farābād) is a village in Pirsalman Rural District, in the Central District of Asadabad County, Hamadan Province, Iran. At the 2006 census, its population was 195, in 43 families.

References 

Populated places in Asadabad County